Sphingomonas kyungheensis  is a Gram-negative, aerobic and motile bacteria from the genus of Sphingomonas with a polar flagellum which has been isolated from soil from a ginseng field.

References

Further reading

External links
Type strain of Sphingomonas kyungheensis at BacDive -  the Bacterial Diversity Metadatabase

kyungheensis
Bacteria described in 2013